Ricard Artero Ruiz (born 5 February 2003) is a Spanish footballer who plays as a midfielder for Girona FC B.

Club career
Born in La Bisbal d'Empordà, Girona, Catalonia, Artero represented Atlètic Bisbalenc and Girona FC as a youth. In July 2021, after finishing his formation, he signed a professional contract until 2026.

Artero made his senior debut with Girona's reserves on 5 September 2021, starting in a 2–1 Tercera División RFEF away win against CE L'Hospitalet. He made his first-team debut on 4 November, coming on as a second-half substitute for Nahuel Bustos in a 3–1 home success over AD Alcorcón in the Segunda División.

References

External links

2003 births
Living people
People from Baix Empordà
Sportspeople from the Province of Girona
Spanish footballers
Footballers from Catalonia
Association football midfielders
Segunda División players
Tercera Federación players
Girona FC B players
Girona FC players
Spain youth international footballers